Tanongsak Promdard (born 30 March 1985), simply known as A, is a professional footballer from Thailand. He currently plays for Chainat United F.C. in the Thai League 4.

International career

International

Individual
 Thailand Division 1 League Golden Boot: 2008

References

https://us.soccerway.com/players/tanongsak-promdard/288049/

1985 births
Living people
Tanongsak Promdard
Tanongsak Promdard
Association football forwards
Tanongsak Promdard
Tanongsak Promdard
Tanongsak Promdard
Tanongsak Promdard
Tanongsak Promdard
Tanongsak Promdard
Tanongsak Promdard